The Selangor state government refers to the government authority of the Malaysian state of Selangor. The state government adheres to and is created by both the Malaysian federal Constitution, the supreme law of Malaysia, and the Constitution of the State of Selangor, the supreme law in Selangor. The government of Selangor is based in the state's capital city of Shah Alam.

The state government consists of only two branches – executive and legislative. The Selangor State Executive Council forms the executive branch, whilst the Selangor State Legislative Assembly is the legislature of the state government. Selangor's head of government is the Chief Minister. The state government does not have a judiciary branch, as Malaysia's judicial system is a federalised system operating uniformly throughout the country.

Executive

Head of government 

The Menteri Besar is the head of government in Selangor. He is officially appointed by the Sultan, Selangor's head of state, on the basis of the latter's judgement that the former commands the confidence of the majority of the State Assemblymen in the Selangor State Legislative Assembly. The Menteri Besar and his Executive Council shall be collectively responsible to Legislative Assembly. The Office of the Menteri Besar is situated inside Sultan Salahuddin Abdul Aziz Shah Building in Shah Alam.

The current Menteri Besar of Selangor is Amirudin Shari of the People's Justice Party (PKR), which controls the most seats in the State Legislative Assembly among the Pakatan Harapan (PH) component parties. Amirudin Shari was sworn in on 19 June 2018, after the 2018 State Election that saw the PH coalition retaining power in Selangor.

Cabinet 

The Selangor State Executive Council forms the executive branch of the Selangor state government and is analogous in function to the Malaysian federal Cabinet. The Executive Council comprises the Menteri Besar, and between four and 10 other State Assemblymen from the Selangor State Legislative Assembly. Aside from these, three other ex officio members of the Executive Council are the State Secretary, the State Legal Adviser and the State Financial Officer.

Following the 2018 State Election, the members of the Executive Council are as follows.

Legislature

The Selangor State Legislative Assembly is the legislative branch of the Selangor state government. The unicameral legislature consists of 56 seats that represent the 56 state constituencies within Selangor, with each constituency being represented by an elected State Assemblyman. The Legislative Assembly convenes at the Sultan Salahuddin Abdul Aziz Shah Building in Shah Alam.

The legislature has a maximum mandate of five years by law and follows a multi-party system; the ruling party (or coalition) is elected through a first-past-the-post system. The Sultan may dissolve the legislature at any time and usually does so upon the advice of the Menteri Besar.

A Speaker is elected by the Legislative Assembly to preside over the proceedings and debates of the legislature. The Speaker may or may not be an elected State Assemblyman; in the case of the latter, the elected Speaker shall become a member of the Legislative Assembly additional to the elected State Assemblymen already in the legislature.

Departments, agencies and statutory bodies

Departments 
 Selangor State Treasury Department
 Selangor Islamic Religious Affairs Department
 Selangor Irrigation and Drainage Department
 Office of HRH Sultan of Selangor

Agencies

Statutory bodies

See also 

 Menteri Besar of Selangor
 Local governments in Selangor
 Shah Alam City Council
 Petaling Jaya City Council
 Elections in Selangor

References 

 
Politics of Selangor